Novak Djokovic defeated Jo-Wilfried Tsonga in the final, 4–6, 6–4, 6–3, 7–6(7–2) to win the men's singles tennis title at the 2008 Australian Open.	
It was his first major title, the first of a record ten Australian Open titles, and the first of an all-time joint-record 22 major men's singles titles overall. Djokovic became the first Serbian man to win a major singles title.	 It was the first major final since the 2005 Australian Open not to feature either Roger Federer or Rafael Nadal, who were beaten by Djokovic and Tsonga, respectively, in the semifinals. Alongside second-seeded Nadal, Tsonga (unseeded in this tournament) defeated three more seeds en route to the final, including ninth-seed Andy Murray.

Federer was the two-time defending champion, but lost to Djokovic in the semifinals. The loss ended Federer's record streak of 10 consecutive major finals. However, he became the first man to reach 15 consecutive major quarterfinals (streak starting at the 2004 Wimbledon Championships), surpassing Roy Emerson and Ivan Lendl. This was the only major where Federer failed to reach the final between the 2005 Wimbledon Championships and the 2010 Australian Open, a span of 19 tournaments. He would go on to reach the next eight major finals (winning four of them).

Seeds

Qualifying

Draw

Finals

Top half

Section 1

Section 2

Section 3

Section 4

Bottom half

Section 5

Section 6

Section 7

Section 8

References

External links
 Association of Tennis Professionals (ATP) – 2008 Australian Open Men's Singles draw
 2008 Australian Open – Men's draws and results at the International Tennis Federation

Men's Singles
Australian Open (tennis) by year – Men's singles